Skirsnemunė is a village in Jurbarkas district municipality, Tauragė County, Lithuania. It is situated on the Neman River about 9 km from Jurbarkas. According to the 2011 census, it had 772 residents. The village traces it history to Christmemel, a fortress built by the Teutonic Knights on a nearby hill fort in 1313. The fortress was abandoned in 1328. The town church was funded by the last will of Mykolas, son of Jonas Kęsgaila, in 1523. Skirsnemunė received Magdeburg rights in 1792.

Gallery

References

 Borchert, Friedrich. Landsmannschaft Ostpreußen e.V. (26 May 2001). "Kampf im Osten – Diplomatie im Westen". Retrieved 11 April 2006.
 Urban, William. The Teutonic Knights: A Military History. Greenhill Books. London, 2003, pp. 133, 162, 167, 168. 

Villages in Tauragė County